The Motorola E770 mobile phone (also known as the E770v denoting a Vodafone network specific variant of this handset) is a 3G phone that operates primarily on the third generation phone network; however, it can be downscable to GPRS 2.5 and below if required. 

The E770v resembles very much by looks with Motorola's famous E398 model; still, the hardware differences are pretty substantial.

It was announced in 2005, 4th Quarter.

Performance 

It weighs 108 grams The Standard Battery has 160 mins talktime and a standby time of 260 hours.

Features 

 Built-in antenna
 Built-in handsfree
 UMTS and GSM Triband - 900/1800/1900 MHz
 WAP 2.0 / xHTML Browser
 Data compatible via USB cable or Bluetooth
 Internal Memory - 32MB
 MicroSD TransFlash External Memory Card up to 1GB
 Java MIDP 2.0
 SyncML
 Messaging: SMS, MMS, Email, Instant messaging. 
 MP3, MP4, WMA music support
 Vibrate alert
 TFT display,  176 x 220 pixels (30 x 38 mm), 65K colors.
 Video capture, playback, download and streaming
 2 built-in VGA digital cameras:
 640x840 video camera.
 Secondary VGA video call camera
 Video messaging
 Video playback full screen at 176/144   30fps

Data 

 GPRS: Class 10 (4+1/3+2 slots), 32 - 48 kbit/s 
 HSCSD: No 
 EDGE: No 
 3G: Yes, 384 kbit/s. 
 WLAN:  No 
 Bluetooth: v1.2 with A2DP 
 Infrared port: No 
 USB: miniUSB

Limitations 

The phone has been found to have some limitations by its users, including bluetooth file transfer size limitations, non-removable or changeable operator settings such as logos and hotkeys, and music playback limitations (bitrates over 192 kbit/s are not supported).

References 

 Motorola E770 - Full phone specifications

External links 

 Motorola Website link to E770
 Motorola.com
 English forums for Motorola E770

E770
Videotelephony
Mobile phones introduced in 2005